Cymbacha is a genus of crab spiders that was first described by Ludwig Carl Christian Koch in 1874.

Species
 it contains eight species, endemic to Papua New Guinea, Australia, and Sri Lanka:
Cymbacha cerea L. Koch, 1876 – Australia (Queensland)
Cymbacha festiva L. Koch, 1874 (type) – Australia (Queensland, New South Wales)
Cymbacha ocellata L. Koch, 1874 – Australia (Queensland)
Cymbacha saucia L. Koch, 1874 – New Guinea, Australia (Queensland)
Cymbacha setosa L. Koch, 1874 – Australia (Queensland)
Cymbacha similis L. Koch, 1876 – Australia (New South Wales, Tasmania)
Cymbacha simplex Simon, 1895 – Sri Lanka
Cymbacha striatipes L. Koch, 1876 – Australia (Queensland)

See also
 List of Thomisidae species

References

Further reading

Araneomorphae genera
Spiders of Asia
Spiders of Australia
Taxa named by Carl Ludwig Koch
Thomisidae